Beloch is a European surname. Notable people with the surname include:

 Karl Julius Beloch (1854–1929), German classical and economic historian
 Margherita Piazzola Beloch (1879–1976), Italian mathematician, daughter of Karl

See also
 Baloch (surname)

Surnames of European origin